is a Japanese athlete. She competed in the women's long jump at the 1960 Summer Olympics.

References

1937 births
Living people
Athletes (track and field) at the 1960 Summer Olympics
Japanese female long jumpers
Olympic athletes of Japan
Place of birth missing (living people)
Universiade bronze medalists for Japan
Universiade medalists in athletics (track and field)
Medalists at the 1995 Summer Universiade
20th-century Japanese women
21st-century Japanese women